Takifugu flavidus, commonly known as the yellowbelly pufferfish, is a species of pufferfish in the family Tetraodontidae. It is native to the Yellow Sea, the East China Sea, and the Bohai Sea, where it is found near shore. It a demersal species that reaches 35 cm (13.8 inches) SL. It is reported to be dangerously toxic to humans, although poisonous pufferfish are frequently prepared as fugu and consumed.

References 

flavidus
Fish described in 1975